Wayne Marshall (born 7 November 1963) is a former Australian professional rugby league player. A hooker, he is best remembered for his time spent playing for the Eastern Suburbs between 1988 and 1994. Marshall also represented Brisbane side Easts (1987) and Salford (1994–95) in the United Kingdom.

References

1963 births
Living people
Australian expatriate rugby league players
Eastern Suburbs Tigers players
Salford Red Devils players
Sydney Roosters players